George Vincent McWilliam (3 February 1878 – 21 May 1968) was an Australian rules footballer who played with Fitzroy in the Victorian Football League (VFL).		

Educated at Geelong College, McWilliam was a member of the 1st Football Teams of 1893 and 1894 and the 1st Cricket Team of 1893. He married Eva Marie Moroni in 1900 and became a chemist, initially living in Williamstown. They moved to Eaglehawk around 1903 and George quickly became a leading footballer in the Bendigo district and captain of the Eaglehawk team. In 1907 he was recruited by Fitzroy and played a total of 18 games for them. He later returned to Eaglehawk, playing with them until he left the district in 1915.

McWilliam enlisted to serve in World War I on 23 July 1915, aged 37. He embarked from Melbourne on HMAT A42 Boorara for Egypt on 10 May 1917 and served as a Staff Sergeant with the Australian Camel Brigade Field Ambulance.

After his return to Australia he worked and lived in Ascot Vale for many years until his death in 1968.

Notes

External links 

1878 births
1968 deaths
Australian rules footballers from Melbourne
Fitzroy Football Club players
People educated at Geelong College
People from Richmond, Victoria
Australian military personnel of World War I
Military personnel from Melbourne